Cherukunnapuzha is a   tributary of the river Mangalam river, passing through Alathur Taluk in Palakkad district. This river joins with some streams to form Mangalam River. Mangalam river is the largest tributary of the river Gayathripuzha which  itself is one of the tributaries of the river Bharathapuzha, the second-longest river in Kerala, south India. The river joins Mangalam river near Mangalam Dam and its waters continue with Mangalam river until Plazhi in the border of Thrissur and Palakkad districts, and eventually turns to Gayathripuzha until Mayannur, where it joins Bharathapuzha, and finally reaching the Arabian Sea.

Rivers of Palakkad district
Bharathappuzha